Grieg Taber (January 21, 1895 - April 8, 1964) was a prominent Anglo-Catholic priest in the American Episcopal Church during the twentieth century. He was born in Omaha, Nebraska and educated at the former St. Stephen's College, Annandale-on-Hudson (BA) and the former Seabury Divinity School (BD 1919). He was ordained to the diaconate in June 1919 and to the priesthood in December 1919. Initially a priest-educator, Taber was master at the Shattuck School in Faribault, Minnesota from 1918 to 1920, and chaplain and instructor in History and Greek at the Trinity-Pawling School (1920–1927).

Taber achieved national prominence as an Anglo-Catholic leader as rector of All Saints Church, Ashmont, Dorchester, Massachusetts (1927–1939) and rector of St. Mary the Virgin, Times Square, from 1939 until his death in 1964. He was a trustee of St. Luke's Home for Destitute and Aged Women, treasurer-general of the American Confraternity of the Blessed Sacrament from 1953 to 1963, and received an honorary Doctor of Divinity degree from Seabury-Western Theological Seminary in 1940.

According to his obituary in the New York Times, Taber was a bachelor with a love of music who died of a heart attack at the Metropolitan Opera during Giacomo Puccini's Tosca.

He was succeeded by Donald L. Garfield.

References 

Episcopal Clerical Directory
"Grieg Taber of Ashmont Ordained," The Boston Globe, December 20, 1919
"Fr. Taber Goes to N. York," The Boston Globe, July 8, 1939
"Grieg Taber," New York Daily News, April 10, 1964, p. 41
Ave parish magazine

External links 
Pray the Mass (New York: St. Mary's Press, 1953)
Grave at Milton Cemetery in Norfolk County, Massachusetts

1895 births
1964 deaths
Clergy from Omaha, Nebraska
Seabury-Western Theological Seminary alumni
Anglo-Catholic clergy
American Anglo-Catholics
American Episcopal priests